The 2017 Speed Energy Stadium Super Trucks Series was the fifth season of the Stadium Super Trucks series. Paul Morris won his first series championship with a one-point advantage over Matthew Brabham.

Drivers

Schedule

Season summary
For the third consecutive year, the new SST season began at Adelaide Street Circuit to support the Supercars Championship's Clipsal 500 Adelaide. Lucas Oil Off Road Racing Series driver Jeff Hoffman made his series debut, while Gavin Harlien ran his first race since 2015. In Race 1, V8 Ute Racing Series racer Craig Dontas, who helped SST establish a following in Australia, started in the second row and quickly took the lead. Although Paul Morris and Matthew Brabham passed Dontas on the final lap, Harlien wrecked after making contact with Erik Davis and flipped, causing the race to be red flagged and Dontas to be declared the race winner. Sheldon Creed beat Toby Price to win Race 2. The final race began with Dontas flipping, leading to a red flag that shortened the race from eight to five laps. Hoffman led the race until Morris passed him and went on to win; Hoffman was eventually involved in a battle with his Royal Purple teammate Harlien, ending when Harlien hit the wall and triggered a wreck that involved Davis, Price, and Travis Milburn.

The trucks' first American race took place with the IndyCar Series' Firestone Grand Prix of St. Petersburg. Sprint car racing driver Davey Hamilton Jr. joined the series for his maiden SST start, driving the No. 75 Always Evolving truck owned by Davis. Although Brabham led much of Race 1, power steering issues and a late spin knocked him out of the win; instead, Robby Gordon and Creed fought for the victory, with the former holding the latter off to win his first race at St. Petersburg since 2014. Brabham rebounded by winning Race 2, the first non-American SST winner at the track.

In January, the Toyota Grand Prix of Long Beach and the series formed a multi-year agreement to continue racing at the street course. Brabham took the weekend victory as he won Race 1 and finished second in Race 2; Gordon won the latter. Myles Cheek, who raced in the series' Super Trophy Kart division in 2013, made his series debut at Long Beach as he finished seventh and eighth, including spinning in Race 2.

Returning to Australia in May, SST's races at Barbagallo Raceway in conjunction with the Perth SuperSprint was their first at a closed circuit. Jake Kostecki ran his first SST weekend in the No. 75, but contact on a ramp with Milburn in Race 1 caused him to roll through the grass; Harlien attempted to dodge Kostecki's truck but stalled his vehicle, eliminating him from the race. Creed avoided the wreck and eventually won the round. Kostecki missed the rest of the weekend due to the damage. Gordon won Race 2, while Creed beat Gordon to the finish in Race 3 by .023 seconds, one of the closest finishes in series history.

Creed's success continued as he swept the two Chevrolet Detroit Grand Prix races. Gordon missed the weekend as he was competing in the Baja 500, with Hamilton serving as the interim No. 7 driver. Stock Car Brasil driver Átila Abreu also made his SST debut at Detroit, driving the No. 51 with sponsorship from his SCB team Shell Oil Company and Monster Energy.

A week after Detroit, the series followed IndyCar to Texas Motor Speedway for the Rainguard Water Sealers 600, where SST raced on a dirt track featuring elements of the infield, pit road, and the frontstretch. As further promotion for the trucks, TMS' turn two held an off-road expo called the "Off-Road Ruckus", which allowed visitors to drive their off-road vehicles along an obstacle course and observe exhibits. P. J. Jones and Creed won the two races, but Harlien claimed the overall weekend victory with third- and second-place finishes.

The trucks' next trip to Australia, the Hidden Valley Raceway in Darwin as part of the Darwin Triple Crown, was their first points racing at the track; in 2016, Morris, Price, and Brad Gallard participated in an SST demonstration at Hidden Valley. Morris won Races 1 and 3 in close battles with Gordon, but Race 2 saw him hit the tire barrier in a chicane and roll over; Brabham won the round. After the weekend, Gordon took a stadium truck to a nightclub in the city, where he performed donuts. He was eventually charged with and pleaded guilty to traffic and anti-hooning violations, leading to a fine, though he defended his actions as he had received prior approval from security guards. The Confederation of Australian Motor Sport (CAMS) revoked Gordon's competition visa for future events, barring him from racing in the country and jeopardizing the series' future. An apology and $10,000 donation to the Australian Road Safety Foundation in October led to the ban being lifted.

In July, SST joined Monster Jam for a round at the Beijing National Stadium, their first trip to Asia since a demo in Mongolia in 2016 and their inaugural Asian points race. Among the ten SST drivers was newcomer Li Ya Tao. Racing on a dirt oval, Hamilton led the most laps and won the race, but was disqualified as he had not taken the Joker Lap; instead, Brabham was declared the winner.

The following month, the series was a part of IndyCar's Grand Prix at The Glen at Watkins Glen International. Officially known as the UFD at The Glen, it was SST's first race in the northeastern United States and first on an American permanent road course. Gordon and Brabham won the weekend's two races.

To close 2017, SST organized the inaugural Race & Rock World Championship at the Lake Elsinore Diamond baseball park. Among those in the field were X Games Austin 2014 gold medalist Apdaly Lopez, female off-road racer Sara Price, NASCAR's Casey Mears, Trans-Am Series veteran Adam Andretti, and four-time AMA Motocross champion Ryan Villopoto. Morris skipped the weekend as he was tending to a rib injury, so he tasked Jerett Brooks with driving his No. 67 truck. Both races were determined by two heats each, with Lopez and Creed winning on Friday; Mears, Davis, Andretti, and Greg Adler failed to qualify for the Friday feature. Lopez went on to win Race 1. Saturday featured heat wins by Creed and Brooks. The two dominated the second half of Race 2, with Brooks' runner-up finish and Brabham's eighth securing the championship for Morris by one point.

Results and standings

Race results

Drivers' championship

Driver replacements

Notes

References

Stadium Super Trucks
Stadium Super Trucks
Stadium Super Trucks